Lousonna (also Lousanna) is a Roman archaeological site in Switzerland.  It preceded the present-day city of Lausanne.

The Romans built a military camp on this spot, which they called Lousonna, at the site of a Celtic settlement near Lake Geneva.

Gallery

See also 
 Switzerland in the Roman era

References

External links 

 Page on the website of the City of Lausanne
 Lausanne Roman Museum

Archaeological sites in Switzerland
Roman towns and cities in Switzerland
Coloniae (Roman)
Lausanne
Former populated places in Switzerland
Buildings and structures in the canton of Vaud
Tourist attractions in the canton of Vaud